The Romania national under-19 football team represents Romania in international football at this age level and is controlled by Federația Română de Fotbal, the governing body for football in Romania.

Honours
 UEFA European Under-19 Football Championship
 Under-19 era, 2002–present
Champions (0):
Runner-up (0):
 Under-18 era, 1957–2001
Champions (1): 1962
Runner-up (1): 1960

Current squad
 The following players were called up for the Elite Tour.
 Match dates: 22, 25 and 28 March 2023
 Opposition: ,  and Caps and goals correct as of: 25 September 2022, after the match against .

Recent call-ups
The following players have been called upto the squad within the last twelve months and remain eligible for selection.

Results and fixtures

2020
U-19

2021
U-19

 2022 UEFA European Under-19 Championship 

 Qualified teams for the final tournament 

The following teams qualified for the final tournament of the 2022 UEFA European Under-19 Championship'.Note: All appearance statistics include only U-19 era (since 2002).''

See also 
 Romania men's national football team
 Romania men's national under-21 football team
 Romania men's national under-20 football team
 Romania men's national under-17 football team
 Romania women's national football team
 Romania women's national under-19 football team
 Romania women's national under-17 football team
 European Under-19 Football Championship

References

External links
 Football Association of Romania

European national under-19 association football teams
Football